Tonkolele is a town in the mountains of central Sierra Leone.

Resources 

It is the site of iron ore deposits. Plans to build a railway to Port Pepel, to exploit those deposits, were announced in October 2010.

See also 

 Railway stations in Sierra Leone

References

External links 
 Tonkoliki Project

Populated places in Sierra Leone